The second presidency of Carlos Andrés Pérez (1989–93) started with an economic crisis, a major riot in which hundreds were killed by security forces (Caracazo, 1989), followed by an economic recovery by also two coup attempts in 1992, and his 1993 impeachment. He was the first Venezuelan President to be impeached.

Background

For the 1988 presidential election Democratic Action (AD) President Jaime Lusinchi backed Octavio Lepage as AD candidate, but in a primary election the party chose Carlos Andrés Pérez (previously president from 1974 to 1979).

Presidency
Carlos Andrés Pérez based his campaign for the 1988 Venezuelan general election in his legacy of abundance during his first presidential period and initially rejected liberalization policies. However, Venezuela's international reserves were only $300 million USD at the time of Pérez' election into the presidency; Pérez decided to respond to the debt, public spending, economic restrictions and rentier state by liberalizing the economy. Among the policies there was the reduction of fuel subsidies and the increase of public transportation fares by thirty percent (VEB 16 Venezuelan bolívares, or $0.4 USD).

The increase was supposed to be implemented on 1 March 1989, but bus drivers decided to apply the price rise on 27 February, a day before payday in Venezuela. President Andrés Pérez ordered the activation of Plan Ávila and the intervention of the military. A commission was established in the Venezuelan Congress with all its political parties to investigate the events during the Caracazo and unanimously voted for a report that concluded that 277 people were killed, though the Venezuelan media reported up to 3,000 deaths.

By late 1991, as part of the economic reforms, Carlos Andrés Pérez' administration had sold three banks, a shipyard, two sugar mills, an airline, a telephone company and a cell phone band, receiving a total of $2,287 million USD. The most remarkable auction was CANTV's, a telecommunications company, which was sold at the price of  $1,885 million USD to the consortium composed of American AT&T International, General Telephone Electronic and the Venezuelan Electricidad de Caracas and Banco Mercantil. The privatization ended Venezuela's monopoly over telecommunications and surpassed even the most optimistc predictions, with over $1,000 million USD above the base price and $500 million USD more than the bid offered by the competition group. By the end of the year, inflation had dropped to 31 %, Venezuela's international reserves were now worth $14,000 million USD and there was an economic growth of 9 % (called as an "Asian growth"), the largest in Latin America at the time.

In 1992, his government survived two coup attempts. The first attempt took place 4 February 1992, and was led by Lieutenant-Colonel Hugo Chávez from the Venezuelan Army, who was later elected president. With the attempt having clearly failed, Chávez was catapulted into the national spotlight when he was allowed to appear live on national television to call for all remaining rebel detachments in Venezuela to cease hostilities. When he did so, Chávez famously quipped on national television that he had only failed "por ahora"—"for now". The second, and much bloodier, insurrection took place on 27 November 1992, and this time, civilians and military personnel from both the Venezuelan Air Force and the Bolivarian Navy of Venezuela were involved. 172 died during the second coup attempt.

Impeachment
On 20 March 1993, Attorney General Ramón Escovar Salom, introduced action against Pérez for the misappropriation of 250 million bolivars belonging to a presidential discretionary fund, or partida secreta. The money was used to support the electoral process in Nicaragua, and during the process it was revealed that the money was used to support and hire bodyguards for President Violeta Chamorro. On 20 May 1993, the Supreme Court considered the accusation valid, and the following day the Senate voted to strip Pérez of his immunity. Pérez refused to resign, but after the maximum 90 days temporary leave available to the President under Article 188 of the 1961 constitution, the National Congress removed Pérez from office permanently on 31 August.

Pérez' trial concluded in May 1996, and he was sentenced to 28 months in prison.

Second presidency cabinet (1989-1993)

See also 
Second inauguration of Carlos Andrés Pérez
First Presidency of Carlos Andrés Pérez
Presidents of Venezuela

References

Bibliography 

 
 

History of Venezuela
Carlos Andrés Pérez
Pérez, Carlos Andrés